Ion Caras (born 11 September 1950) is a Moldovan former footballer and former manager of the Moldova national team. Under Ion Caras, in 51 matches Moldova gathered 10 victories, 10 draws and 31 losses.

References

External links

Living people
People from Bălți
Soviet footballers
Moldovan footballers
Soviet football managers
Moldovan football managers
Moldova national football team managers
FC Zimbru Chișinău managers
FC Zimbru Chișinău players
FC Nistru Otaci managers
1950 births
Association football defenders